Calgary-Lougheed is a provincial electoral district in Alberta, Canada. It is one of 87 districts mandated to return a single member to the Legislative Assembly of Alberta using the first-past-the-post method of voting.

The district is primarily urban, and it exists on the suburban fringes of the city of Calgary. It was created in the 1993 boundary redistribution from Calgary-Shaw, and is named in honour of former Premier Peter Lougheed, who held the nearby seat of Calgary West from 1967 to 1986.

The district has been a stronghold for Progressive Conservative candidates since it was created. The riding is currently vacant following the resignation of the former Premier of Alberta, Jason Kenney of the United Conservative Party. The first MLA was Jim Dinning who previously represented Calgary-Shaw.

The district contains the neighbourhoods of Bridlewood and Evergreen.

History
The electoral district was created in the 1993 boundary redistribution from Calgary-Shaw and Highwood. In the 2010 Boundary redistribution all land east of 14 Street was cut out of the riding and given to Shaw and Calgary-Fish Creek.

Boundary history

Representation history

The electoral district was created from Calgary-Shaw in the 1993 boundary redistribution. The first election held that year saw incumbent Progressive Conservative MLA Jim Dinning defeat Liberal candidate Jack Driscoll and three other candidates.  Dinning retired from the legislature in 1997.

The 1997 election saw Progressive Conservative candidate Marlene Graham elected with a landslide majority. She was re-elected with a larger margin in the 2001 general election and retired at dissolution in 2004.

The 2004 election saw Progressive Conservative candidate Dave Rodney win a very large majority to hold the seat for his party. He was easily re-elected in 2008 and 2012.

In 2015, however, Rodney barely held the seat in a close three-way race against NDP and Wildrose challengers. In 2017, the Progressive Conservative and Wildrose parties merged to form the United Conservative Party, which Rodney joined. He subsequently resigned his seat to allow party leader Jason Kenney to run in a by-election. Kenney was elected by a wide margin over the NDP candidate and Liberal leader David Khan.

Legislature results

1993 general election

|}

1997 general election

|}

2001 general election

|}

2004 general election

|}

2008 general election

|}

2012 general election

2015 general election

2017 by-election

2019 general election

Senate nominee results

2004 Senate nominee election district results

Voters had the option of selecting 4 Candidates on the Ballot

2012 Senate nominee election district results

{| border=1 cellpadding=4 cellspacing=0 style="margin: 1em 1em 1em 0; background: #f9f9f9; border: 1px #aaa solid; border-collapse: collapse; font-size: 95%; clear:both"
|- style="background-color:#E9E9E9"
! colspan=5| 2012 Senate nominee election results: Calgary-Lougheed
|- style="background-color:#E9E9E9"
! colspan=2 style="width: 130px"|Party
! style="width: 125px"|Candidate
! style="width: 50px"|Votes
! style="width: 40px"|%
|-

References

External links
Website of the Legislative Assembly of Alberta

Alberta provincial electoral districts
Politics of Calgary